"Christmas Dream" is a song written by Andrew Lloyd Webber and Tim Rice, with German lyrics by Andre Heller, for the 1974 Columbia film The Odessa File.  It is sung by Perry Como and the London Boy Singers. Como and the choir performed the song, a few weeks after the film's October 1974 release, on the television special Perry Como's Christmas Show. 
The song was subsequently released as a single, reaching #92 on the Billboard Hot 100 chart in December 1974. It was also included on the soundtrack album for the film, and later on Como's 1982 album I Wish It Could Be Christmas Forever.

Cover versions
The song was covered that same year by Maynard Williams
In 1981 by Scottish singer Isla St Clair. 
It also was sung by a Toronto-based a cappella group, The Mistletones, who were active in the 1980s and 1990s.  It appears on their 1995 album Acapella Christmas.
In 2013 it was covered by Terry Wogan, Aled Jones and Hayley Westenra. 
In 2019 it was covered by The Taters on their album "SHINY & BRITE"

References

1974 songs
British Christmas songs
Songs with lyrics by Tim Rice
Songs with music by Andrew Lloyd Webber
Songs written for films